Curzio is both a given name and a surname.

Notable people with the given name include:
Curzio Cocci (died 1621), Roman Catholic prelate 
Curzio Malaparte (1898–1957), Italian writer, film-maker, war correspondent and diplomat

Notable people with the surname include:
Alberto Quadrio Curzio (born 1937), Italian economist